This list is of Japanese structures dating from the Shōwa period (1926–1989) that have been designated Important Cultural Properties. As of October 2016, fifty-three properties with one hundred and eight component structures have been so designated.

Structures

See also
 Cultural Properties of Japan
 The Modern Industrial Heritage Sites in Kyushu and Yamaguchi
 List of Important Cultural Properties of Japan (Taishō period: structures)

References

Shōwa period
Important Cultural Properties of Japan
Architecture in Japan